The 2004–05 Barys Astana season was the 7th season in the Kazakhstan Hockey Championship and the 2nd season in the First League of the Russian Ice Hockey Championship, in parallel.

Kazakhstan Hockey Championship

Standings

Schedule and results

References

Barys Astana seasons
Barys